Best of Rajaton 1999–2009 is a compilation album by Finnish a cappella ensemble Rajaton, released in October 2009. It includes some of the group's most popular songs and two previously unreleased tracks: Tosi Lapsellinen Joulusikermä and a cover of the Finnish 1989 Eurovision entry La Dolce Vita. A DVD is also included, featuring several live performances and music videos.

Track listing
Butterfly from Boundless, 2001  Music & Lyrics: Mia Makaroff / Arr. Mia Makaroff & Anna-Mari Kähärä
Mitä Kaikatat, Kivonen? from Out of Bounds, 2006  Lyrics: Kanteletar / Music: Mia Makaroff
Laulu Oravasta from Nova, 2000  Lyrics: Aleksis Kivi / Music: Kaj Chydenius / Arr. Jussi ChydeniusMe Kuljemme Kaikki Kuin Sumussa from Nova, 2000  Lyrics: Eino Leino / Music: Jussi ChydeniusUnder Pressure from Rajaton sings Queen, 2008  Music & Lyrics by Queen & David Bowie / Arr. Hannu LepolaFernando from Rajaton sings ABBA, 2006  Music & Lyrics by Benny Andersson, Björn Ulvaeus & Stig Anderson / Arr. Jussi ChydeniusKaipaava from Boundless, 2001  Trad. Finnish / Arr. Essi Wuorela & Jussi ChydeniusDobbin's Flowery Vale from Out of Bounds, 2006  Trad. Irish / Arr. Matti KallioKivinen Tie from Kevät, 2005  Music & Lyrics: Soila Sariola / Arr. Soila Sariola, Jyri Sariola & Leri LeskinenVillihanhen Laulu from Maa, 2007  Lyrics: Katri Vala / Music: Jussi ChydeniusNouse Lauluni from Maa, 2007  Lyrics: Trad. & Soila Sariola / Music: Soila SariolaI Was Brought To My Senses from Out of Bounds, 2006  Music & Lyrics: Sting / Arr. Hannu LepolaKertosäkeen Nainen from Kevät, 2005  Music & Lyrics: Ufo Mustonen / Arr. Jussi Chydenius & Leri LeskinenLa Dolce Vita previously unreleased, 2009  Lyrics: Turkka Mali / Music: Matti Puurtinen / Arr. Hannu LepolaTosi Lapsellinen Joulusikermä previously unreleased, live in Järvenpää, 2007  Various Authors / Arr. Jussi ChydeniusPukki tietää from Joulu, 2003  Lyrics: Arto Tamminen & Kim Kuusi / Music: Kim Kuusi / Arr. Jussi ChydeniusJoululaulu from Joulu, 2003  Lyrics: Zachris Topelius / Music: Jussi ChydeniusVarpunen Jouluaamuna from Joulu, 2003  Lyrics: Zachris Topelius & K.A. Hougberg / Music: Otto Kotilainen / Arr. Anna-Mari KähäräHeinillä Härkien Kaukalon from Joulu, 2003  Trad. French / Lyrics: Martti Korpilahti / Arr. Jussi ChydeniusStabat Mater from Sanat, 2002  Lyrics: Aale Tynni & Jacopone Da Todi / Music: Kaj ChydeniusDVD Listing

Live
Butterfly Live at Kulttuuritalo, 2007
Dobbin's Flowery Vale Live at Kulttuuritalo, 2007
Lady Madonna Live at Kulttuuritalo, 2003
Tiernapojat, Live at Kulttuuritalo 2003
En Etsi Valtaa, Live at Kulttuuritalo, 2003
Kulkue Live at Savoy Teatteri Helsinki, 2000

Music videos
Bohemian Rhapsody, 2008
Lunta, 2005
Gimme! Gimme! Gimme!, 2004
Butterfly, 2002

Bonus
Kertosäkeen Nainen, 2007 with Rajaton members playing an instrumental accompaniment''

Personnel

 Essi Wuorela – soprano
 Virpi Moskari – soprano
 Soila Sariola – alto
 Hannu Lepola – tenor
 Ahti Paunu – baritone
 Jussi Chydenius – bass

External links
 Official Rajaton website
 Rajaton - Best of 1999-2009 at Last.fm

Rajaton albums
2009 greatest hits albums